Wilhem de Haan (7 February 1801 in Amsterdam – 15 April 1855 in Leiden) was a Dutch zoologist. He specialised in the study of insects and crustaceans, and was the first keeper of invertebrates at the Rijksmuseum in Leiden, now Naturalis. He was forced to retire in 1846, when he was partially paralysed by a spinal disease. He was responsible for the invertebrate volume of Siebold's Fauna Japonica, which was published in 1833, and introduced the western world for the first time to Japanese wildlife. He named a great many new taxa, and several taxa are named in his honour.

He published significant work on both mantids and phasmids (1842).

References
de Haan, W.  Bijdragen tot de Kennis Orthoptera. in C.J. Temminck,  Verhandelingen over de natuurlijke Geschiedenis der Nederlandsche overzeesche Bezittingen. volume 2.(1842)

External links
Fauna Japonica online – de Haan's work begins on the 36th page.

1801 births
1855 deaths
Dutch biologists
Dutch zoologists
Dutch lepidopterists
Dutch carcinologists
Scientists from Amsterdam
People from Leiden
Leiden University alumni